Harry Lydle Kimberlin (March 13, 1909 – December 31, 1999) was a pitcher in Major League Baseball. He played for the St. Louis Browns.

References

External links

1909 births
1999 deaths
Major League Baseball pitchers
St. Louis Browns players
Baseball players from Missouri
People from Sullivan, Missouri